Beals Creek is a river in Texas. The stream begins at Salt Lake just west of Big Spring, where the Sulphur Springs Draw meets the Mustang Draw. The creek flows in a generally east/southeast direction to the Colorado River south of Colorado City.

Local legend believes Montezuma is buried in the creek bed at an unknown location. The legend is Montezuma was able to escape the fall of Tenochtitlan and flee north only to finally die from his injuries.  In an unusual peaceful act, both local Comanche and Pawnee tribes combined to dam the creek and perform a traditional funeral only then to undam the creek and commit a mass suicide so no one could unearth the great Aztec leader.

See also
List of rivers of Texas

References

USGS Geographic Names Information Service
USGS Hydrologic Unit Map - State of Texas (1974)

Rivers of Texas
Tributaries of the Colorado River (Texas)